Lioba may refer to:

 Leoba (710–782), Anglo-Saxon missionary and saint
 974 Lioba, minor planet orbiting the Sun
 USS Lioba (AF-36), Adria-class stores ship acquired by the U.S. Navy for service in World War II